Brian Ballagh O'Neill (Irish: Brian Ballach Ó Néill) was a king of Clandeboye in medieval Ireland. He succeeded his father, Muirchertach Ceannfada O'Neill, to the kingship of Clandeboye after his death in 1395. He reigned until his own death in battle in 1425, after which he was succeeded by his son Murtagh Roe O'Neill who had to contend with his uncle Henry Caoch O'Neill for it. O'Neill's nickname ballach meant "freckled". A younger son, Hugh Boy II O'Neill, would also become lord of Clandeboye.

O'Neill was the common ancestor of the Clandonnell O'Neills and Killetra O'Neills, via his sons Hugh Boy and Conladh respectively.

References

Clandeboye
14th-century Irish monarchs
15th-century Irish monarchs
O'Neill dynasty
1425 deaths